Vathlo Island is a fictional location on the planet of Krypton in the DC Comics universe.

Publication history
In issue #234 of Superman (February 1971), the first apparently dark-skinned Kryptonian was featured, and described as being employed at "Vathlo Station", but the origin of this previously unseen Kryptonian ethnicity otherwise went uncommented on.

Half a year later, in Superman #239 (June 1971), a panel drawn by artist Sal Amendola described a "Vathlo Island" in the "Old World" hemisphere of Krypton as being populated by a "highly developed black race".

DC generally lagged behind its competitor Marvel Comics, and Superman comics generally more so than other DC titles, in depicting characters of color. This brown-skinned Kryptonian was the first person of African appearance ever shown in a Superman book, which had been ongoing 33 years at that time. It is unknown who exactly was responsible for introducing these first nonwhite races to Krypton's demographic makeup, but Mark Waid has speculated that it was E. Nelson Bridwell, editorial assistant on the Superman books at the time. The commentary on the Vathlorians being "highly developed" (as if it were peculiar and noteworthy that people with dark skin might be developed) is generally seen by modern commentators as being well-intended but "cringeworthy".

Other commentators have noted that the creation of Vathlo Island inspired a whole host of other questions, such as 'If there are black Kryptonians, why are they so seldom seen, and why do they appear to live only on one island?' Gizmodo noted that a Krypton structured this way seems "segregated as hell", while Gene Demby observed that this was an example of "segregation in everything".

Vathlo was rarely if ever referenced beyond these few issues, although a black Kryptonian named "Iph-Ro of Vathlo" appeared in the more recent Superman: The Man of Steel #111. An offhand reference to the island was made in Alan Moore's story "For the Man Who Has Everything", where "racial trouble with the Vathlo Island immigrants" are mentioned in a dream-world Krypton that had avoided destruction. It is believed, based on the appearances of black Kryptonians in recent Superman issues, that the Vathlonians eventually were integrated into Krypton proper, although there has been no canonical statement about this from DC Comics.

In Superman: World of New Krypton #4, it is established that Vathlo Islanders settled in Kandor prior to the destruction of Krypton.

In Final Crisis #7 a black version of Superman is shown to reside on the alternate universe of Earth-23. This Superman, whose given name is Kalel but adopts the human alias of Calvin Ellis, is shown to originate from Vathlo Island of his reality's Krypton.

In other media
While the island itself did not appear and was not referenced in the television series Smallville, African-looking/dark-skinned Kryptonians have been featured. One was a disciple of Zod, who goes by the name Nam-Ek (portrayed by Leonard Roberts). Another was named Basqat (played by Adrian Holmes).

Dark-skinned Kryptonians have also appeared in the SyFy television series Krypton, including Lyta-Zod, one of the series' main characters, and General Zod himself. In this version, Vathlo Island is not mentioned.

References

Superman
DC Comics locations
Fictional islands
Kryptonians
Fiction set in the Andromeda Galaxy